Yttrium-90 is an isotope of yttrium. Yttrium-90 has found a wide range of uses in radiation therapy to treat some forms of cancer.

Decay
 undergoes β− decay to zirconium-90 with a half-life of 64.1 hours and a decay energy of 2.28 MeV with an average beta energy of 0.9336 MeV. It also produces 0.01% 1.7 MeV photons during its decay process to the 0+ state of 90Zr, followed by pair production. The interaction between emitted electrons and matter can lead to the emission of Bremsstrahlung radiation.

Production
Yttrium-90 is produced by the nuclear decay of strontium-90 which has a half-life of nearly 29 years and is a fission product of uranium used in nuclear reactors. As the strontium-90 decays, chemical high-purity separation is used to isolate the yttrium-90 before precipitation.

Medical application 
90Y plays a significant role in the treatment of hepatocellular carcinoma (HCC), leukemia, and lymphoma, although it has the potential to treat a range of tumors. Trans-arterial radioembolization is a procedure performed by interventional radiologists in which microspheres are impregnated with 90Y and injected into the arteries supplying the tumor. The microspheres become lodged in blood vessels surrounding the tumor and the resulting radiation damages the nearby tissue. Radioembolization with 90Y significantly prolongs time-to-progression (TTP) of HCC, has a tolerable adverse event profile, and improves patient quality of life more than do similar therapies. 90Y has also found uses in tumor diagnosis by imaging the Bremsstrahlung radiation released by the microspheres. Positron emission tomography after radioembolization is also possible.

See also 
 Isotopes of yttrium
 Unsealed source radiotherapy

References

External links 
 

Isotopes of yttrium
Medical isotopes